This article list the results of men's doubles category in the 2009 All England Super Series.

Seeds
 Markis Kido and Hendra Setiawan
 Lars Paaske and Jonas Rasmussen
 Koo Kien Keat and Tan Boon Heong
 Mohd Zakry Abdul Latif and Mohd Fairuzizuan Mohd Tazari
 Mathias Boe and Carsten Mogensen
 Lee Yong-dae and Shin Baek-cheol
 Cai Yun and Fu Haifeng
 Anthony Clark and Nathan Robertson

Draws

Finals

Top Half

Bottom Half

Sources
Yonex All England Open Super Series 2009 - Men's doubles

- Mens Doubles, 2009 All England Super Series